The Abra del Acay in La Poma Department, Salta Province, Argentina is the highest point in Argentina's National Route 40.

Inaugurated on 8 July 1960 after three years of construction, this unpaved part of the National Route 40 is only suitable for all-terrain vehicles, with the exception of some months in the year when meteorological and maintenance conditions allow normal vehicles to transit. The road inclination of 4.5% and oxygen deprivation due to altitude make the crossing difficult for both people and vehicles with non-turbocharged engines.

References

Landforms of Salta Province
Mountain passes of Argentina